Iceland  is set to compete at the 2022 World Games in Birmingham, United States, from July 7 to 17, 2022.

Competitors

The following is the list of number of competitors participating in the Games:

Dancesport 

Iceland competed in dancesport.

Latin

Powerlifting

Iceland competed in powerlifting.

References 

Nations at the 2022 World Games
Iceland at multi-sport events
2022 in Icelandic sport